Pseudodexia is a genus of bristle flies in the family Tachinidae.

Species
Pseudodexia eques (Wiedemann, 1830)

Distribution
Costa Rica, Brazil.

References

Diptera of North America
Diptera of South America
Dexiinae
Tachinidae genera
Taxa named by Friedrich Moritz Brauer
Taxa named by Julius von Bergenstamm
Monotypic Brachycera genera